Yūichi Sugita was the defending champion but chose not to defend his title.

Jérémy Chardy won the title after defeating Alex de Minaur 6–4, 4–6, 6–2 in the final.

Seeds

Draw

Finals

Top half

Bottom half

References
Main Draw
Qualifying Draw

Fuzion 100 Surbiton Trophy - Men's Singles
2018 Men's Singles